John Fildes (1811 – 6 July 1875) was a British businessman and Liberal Party politician.

Fildes was a director of the Manchester, Sheffield and Lincolnshire Railway. At the 1865 general election, he was elected as the Member of Parliament (MP) for Great Grimsby, defeating the sitting Conservative MP John Chapman, who was another director of the Manchester, Sheffield and Lincolnshire Railway. Both candidates had canvassed vigorously during the campaign, with Fildes describing himself as a Liberal who had "ever supported measures conducive to the elevation and improvement of the condition of the people".

At the 1868 general election, no Conservative candidate stood in Grismby. However, Fildes was opposed by the Liberal George Tomline, who was described by The Times as a "formidable opponent". Tomline won the seat, defeating Fildes with a majority of 211 votes.

References

External links 
 

1811 births
1875 deaths
Liberal Party (UK) MPs for English constituencies
UK MPs 1865–1868
British railway entrepreneurs
Members of the Parliament of the United Kingdom for Great Grimsby
19th-century English businesspeople